Kaltovka (Kältä) is a rural locality (a selo) and the administrative centre of Kaltovsky Selsoviet, Iglinsky District, Bashkortostan, Russia. The population was 714 as of 2010. There are 14 streets.

Geography 
Kaltovka is located 32 km southeast of Iglino (the district's administrative centre) by road. Voroshilovskoye is the nearest rural locality.

References 

Rural localities in Iglinsky District